Marked Trails is a 1944 American Western film directed by John P. McCarthy.

Plot 
Bob Stevens (Bob Steele) is a young man living in the old west who wants to get out and see the world before he has to settle down and live responsibly. His uncle Harry (Steve Clark), a deputy marshal of the town of Tracy, wants Bob to take up that line of work, which Bob initially refuses. But then Harry recognizes wanted gang members Jack Slade (Mauritz Hugo) and Mary Conway, alias Blanche (Veda Ann Borg), and is murdered by them as he tries to order them out of town. Seeking justice, Bob then joins the U.S. Marshals after all, along with his friend, Parkford (Hoot Gibson). Arriving in Tracy, Bob poses as a trouble-making criminal in order to be recruited to join Slade's gang, which Hoot separately comes to town in the guise of a "dude," a more cultured speech-maker in the name of law and order. In the end, the criminals are discovered and defeated in a shootout.

Cast 
Hoot Gibson as Hoot Parkford
Bob Steele as Bob Stevens
Veda Ann Borg as Blanche / Mary Conway
Ralph Lewis as Henchman Jed
Mauritz Hugo as Jim Slade
Charles Stevens as Henchman Denver
Bud Osborne as Sheriff Jim
Lynton Brent as Henchman Tex
George Morrell as Whippletree, Livery man
Allen D. Sewall as Hank Bradley

External links 

1944 films
1944 Western (genre) films
American black-and-white films
Monogram Pictures films
American Western (genre) films
Films directed by John P. McCarthy
1940s English-language films
1940s American films